Merete Balling-Stockmann (born 10 December 1970) is a Danish former professional tennis player.

Balling-Stockmann is the daughter of tennis player Pia Balling, who was a five-time Danish national singles champion in the 1960s.

A Danish national title winner herself in 1990, Balling-Stockmann competed briefly on the professional tennis tour and won four ITF doubles tournaments. In 1990 she also represented the Denmark Federation Cup team in a tie against Luxembourg in Atlanta, where she and Sofie Albinus lost a dead rubber doubles match to Marie-Christine Goy and Karin Kschwendt.

In the early 1990s she played college tennis for Pepperdine University.

ITF finals

Doubles: 7 (4–3)

References

External links
 
 
 

1970 births
Living people
Danish female tennis players
Pepperdine Waves women's tennis players
20th-century Danish women